Augustus Hotham (date of birth unknown, – 24 December 1896) was an Australian cricketer. He played one first-class cricket match for Victoria in 1856.

See also
 List of Victoria first-class cricketers

References

Year of birth missing
1896 deaths
Australian cricketers
Victoria cricketers
People from Surrey
Melbourne Cricket Club cricketers